They Don't Make 'em Like My Daddy is the twenty-fourth solo studio album by American country music singer-songwriter Loretta Lynn. It was released on September 2, 1974, by MCA Records.

Critical reception

In the September 14 issue, Billboard published a review that said, "When Loretta sings, people listen, and they'll listen to all of these, even though several of the songs have been done before. She has two of her big singles on it and a great deal of new material, out of which will come more singles. The remarkable lady just keeps doing superb songs, and Owen Bradley plays his part." The review also noted "Out of Consideration," "Don't Leave Me Where You Found Me," and "Nothin'" as the best cuts on the album, and a note to record dealers saying that there is "some nostalgia on the back cover, along with great liner notes."

Cashbox also published a review in their September 14 issue which said, "Loretta's bright sparkling vocals have made her one of the most successful females on the country music scene. A sense of boundless happiness is inherent in all her songs, even if they are of the ballad lament type. The lady sings with a refined sense of interpretation that ranks her among the very best of the female country performers. The title track was recently a chart topper. Fine renditions of such country classics as "Behind Closed Doors (Charlie Rich song) ", "If You Love Me (Let Me Know)", "We've Already Tasted Love", "I've Never Been This Far Before", and "I Love". Loretta Lynn is certainly one of the omnipresent reigning queens of country music."

Commercial performance 
The album peaked at No. 6 on the US Billboard Hot Country LP's chart.

The first single, "They Don't Make 'Em Like My Daddy", was released in April 1974 and peaked at No. 4 on the US Billboard Hot Country Singles chart. The album's second single, "Trouble in Paradise", was released in August 1974 and peaked at No. 1 on the US Billboard Hot Country Singles chart, Lynn's eleventh No. 1 single.

Recording 
Recording sessions for the album began on March 4 and 5, 1974, at Bradley's Barn in Mount Juliet, Tennessee. Three additional sessions followed on June 18, 19 and June 20. Three songs on the album were from previous recording sessions. "They Don't Make 'Em Like My Daddy" was recorded on April 25, 1972, during a session for 1972's Here I Am Again. "Ain't Love a Good Thing" and "Nothin'" were recorded during sessions for 1973's Love Is the Foundation, on March 27 and 28, 1973, respectively.

Track listing

Personnel 
Adapted from the album liner notes and MCA recording session records.
Willie Ackerman – drums
Harold Bradley – bass guitar
Owen Bradley – producer
Pete Drake – steel guitar
Ray Edenton – acoustic guitar, electric guitar
Bud Gray – photography
Lloyd Green – steel guitar
Buddy Harman – drums
Darrell Johnson – mastering
The Jordanaires – background vocals
Jerry Kennedy – guitar, dobro
Billy Linneman – bass
Loretta Lynn – lead vocals
Grady Martin – guitar
Charlie McCoy – harmonica, vibes
Bob Moore – bass
Hargus Robbins – piano
Hal Rugg – steel guitar
George Vecsey – liner notes
Pete Wade – guitar
Jim Williamson – engineer

Charts 
Album

Singles

References 

1974 albums
Loretta Lynn albums
Albums produced by Owen Bradley
Decca Records albums